Giovanni Arcimboldi (died 1488) is called the Cardinal of Novara or the Cardinal of Milan and was an Italian Roman Catholic bishop and cardinal. He served many times as the legate to Perugia and was both a Senator of Milan and ran the archdiocese from 1485-1488.

Biography

Giovanni Arcimboldi was born in Parma or Milan in 1421 or 1426. He was the son of Nicolò Arcimboldo (maestro delle Entrate Straordinarie of Filippo Maria Visconti) and his wife Orsina Canossa (descendant of the family of Matilda of Tuscany).

He was educated at the University of Pavia, receiving a doctorate of both laws in 1458. He also studied letters under Italian Renaissance humanist Francesco Filelfo and later maintained a correspondence with Filelfo.

Early in his life, he married Briseide Pietrasanta, and had a daughter, Briseide Arcimboldi. He also later fathered nine illegitimate children.

In July 1458, through the influence of Francesco I Sforza, he gained admission to Milan's prestigious Collegio di Giureconsulti. He afterwards became a Senator of the Duchy of Milan. Francesco I Sforza sent Arcimboldi to Rome as his ambassador to the Holy See.

After the death of his wife, Arcimboldi entered the ecclesiastical state.  He received the four minor orders in September 1461. On September 20, 1466, he was ordained as a subdeacon by the suffragan bishop of Milan. In October 1466, Pope Paul II made him a protonotary apostolic. He also became a canon of Pavia Cathedral and Piacenza Cathedral at this time.

On November 20, 1468, he was elected Bishop of Novara. He took possession of the see in May 1469, but stayed there only a few days before he was called away by Galeazzo Maria Sforza to serve as his ambassador to Pope Sixtus IV, a post he held from May 1472 until February 1473.

In the consistory of May 7, 1473, Pope Sixtus IV made Arcimboldi a cardinal priest. He received the titular church of Santi Nereo e Achilleo on May 17, 1473. He entered Rome on November 24, 1473 and received the red hat on December 10, 1473. The pope then named him Prefect of the Apostolic Signatura, an office he held until his death. On May 31, 1476, he was elected temporary Camerlengo of the Sacred College of Cardinals in the absence of Cardinal Jacopo Piccolomini-Ammannati. He opted for the titular church of Santa Prassede on December 30, 1476.

On January 15, 1477, Pope Sixtus IV named him legate a latare to Perugia. On February 7, 1477, his legation was extended to include the Kingdom of Hungary, the Holy Roman Empire, and the Kingdom of Bohemia.

During the outbreak of bubonic plague, he again served as temporary Camerlengo of the Sacred College of Cardinals, from May 19 to June 5, 1482. He was then elected to a full term as Camerlengo of the Sacred College of Cardinals on January 15, 1483 and held this post until January 19, 1484. On November 15, 1483, Pope Sixtus IV named him legate to Perugia for a second time.

Following the death of Sixtus IV, Cardinal Arcimboldi participated in the papal conclave of 1484 that elected Pope Innocent VIII. In the consistory of September 23, 1484, Innocent VIII confirmed Arcimboldi's appointment as legate to Perugia, and Arcimboldi left on his legation on October 11, 1484, returning to Rome on January 15, 1485.

Meanwhile, on October 25, 1484, he had been transferred to the metropolitan see of Milan. He received the pallium on November 12 and took formal possession of the archdiocese via a procurator, Antonio Griffi, on January 1, 1485.

He died in Rome on October 2, 1488. He is buried in the Basilica di Sant'Agostino.

See also
Catholic Church in Italy

References

1488 deaths
15th-century Italian cardinals
University of Pavia alumni
Archbishops of Milan
1420s births
15th-century Italian Roman Catholic archbishops
Ambassadors of the Duchy of Milan